Harlem Globetrotters is a sports video game published by GameTek for MS-DOS compatible operating systems in 1990 and the Nintendo Entertainment System in 1991. The player  controls the Harlem Globetrotters basketball team. A Sega Genesis conversion was planned but never released.

Gameplay
Unlike most other basketball video games, there is only an exhibition mode in this game where the player can play as either the Harlem Globetrotters or their long-time rivals, the Washington Generals. The player can even pull down the referee's pants or trip the ref when a free throw has been called when playing as the Harlem Globetrotters.

References

1990 video games
Basketball video games
DOS games
Cancelled Sega Genesis games
Cultural depictions of the Harlem Globetrotters
Video games based on real people
Nintendo Entertainment System games
North America-exclusive video games
Multiplayer and single-player video games
Video games developed in the United States